The 1956 Lafayette Leopards football team was an American football team that represented Lafayette College during the 1956 NCAA College Division football season. Lafayette finished last in the Middle Three Conference.

In their fifth year under head coach Steve Hokuf, the Leopards compiled a 6–3 record, but lost both matchups with their conference opponents. Jack Slotter and Robert Burcin were the team captains.

Lafayette played its home games at Fisher Field on College Hill in Easton, Pennsylvania.

Schedule

References

Lafayette
Lafayette Leopards football seasons
Lafayette Leopards football